Oscar Salguero Galisteo (born 11 May 1998) is a Spanish Paralympic swimmer. He represented Spain at the 2020 Summer Paralympics.

Career
Salguero Galisteo represented Spain in the men's 100 metre breaststroke SB8 event at the 2020 Summer Paralympics and won a silver medal.

References

1998 births
Living people
Spanish male breaststroke swimmers
Sportspeople from Sabadell
Paralympic swimmers of Spain
Swimmers at the 2020 Summer Paralympics
Medalists at the 2020 Summer Paralympics
Medalists at the World Para Swimming Championships
Paralympic silver medalists for Spain
Paralympic medalists in swimming
S9-classified Paralympic swimmers